Damien Eduardo Russell (born  August 20, 1970) is a former American football defensive back who played one season with the San Francisco 49ers of the National Football League (NFL). He was drafted by the 49ers in the seventh round of the 1992 NFL Draft. He played college football at Virginia Polytechnic Institute and State University and attended Howard D. Woodson High School in Washington, DC.

External links
Just Sports Stats
Fanbase profile

Living people
1970 births
American football defensive backs
Virginia Tech Hokies football players
San Francisco 49ers players
Players of American football from New York City
H. D. Woodson High School alumni